The canton of Annemasse is an administrative division of the Haute-Savoie department, southeastern France. It was created at the French canton reorganisation which came into effect in March 2015. Its seat is in Annemasse.

It consists of the following communes:
Ambilly
Annemasse 
Ville-la-Grand

References

Cantons of Haute-Savoie